Joseph Hambro (4 November 1780 – 3 October 1848) was a Danish merchant, banker and political advisor.

Early life
Joseph Hambro was born in 1780 in Copenhagen, Denmark. His father, Calmer Hambro, was a Jewish silk and textile merchant, who was born in Rendsburg. At the age of 17, Hambro came to Hamburg where he received his education at Fürst, Haller & Co.

Career
Hambro was a merchant and banker. In 1800, he joined his father's bank and renamed it C. J. Hambro & Son. Under his leadership, the bank gave loans to the Danish government from 1821 to 1827.

In circa. 1830, he acquired Bodenhoffs Plads in Christianshavn, from then on known as Hambros Plads, establishing both a rice mill with Denmark's first steam engine, the country's first canned food factory and a bakery at the site.

Hambro became an advisor to Johan Sigismund von Møsting, who served as the Danish Minister of Finance.

Personal life

He was married to Marianne von Halle (1786–1838), the daughter of Wulf Levin von Halle, a merchant from Copenhagen. They had a son, Carl Joachim Hambro, who moved to London, England, where he founded the Hambros Bank in 1839.

He died in 1848 in London, where he had moved earlier that year.

References

External links
 Joseph Hambro

1780 births
1840 deaths
19th-century Danish businesspeople
Businesspeople from Copenhagen
Danish bankers
Danish merchants
Danish Jews
Joseph